Ratargul Swamp Forest is a freshwater swamp forest located in Gowain River, Fatehpur Union, Gowainghat, Sylhet, Bangladesh. Ratargul was once thought to be the only swamp forest in Bangladesh, and one of the few freshwater swamp forests in the world. Later, more swamp forests namely Jugirkandi Mayabon, Bujir Bon and Lokkhi Baor swamp forest were discovered in Bangladesh. The forest is naturally conserved under the Department of Forestry, Government of Bangladesh.

Its area is 3, 325.61 acre including 504 acre declared as the animal sanctuary in 2015. It is known as the Sundarbans of Sylhet. This only swamp forest in Bangladesh is located  far from Sylhet.  The forest's name comes from the word, "Rata" or "Pati" tree, used by the locals of Sylhet.

The evergreen forest is situated by the river Goain and linked with the channel Chengir Khal. Most of the trees growing here are the Dalbergia reniformis (করচ গাছ Koroch tree). The forest is submerged under 20–30 feet water in the rainy season. For the rest of the year, the water level is about 10 feet deep.

Location 

Ratargul is about 26 kilometres from Sylhet. There is a 3,325 acres wetland in Sylhet range-2 under the forest department and in that wetland Ratargul swamp forest is about 504 acres It is located in Gowainghat. After reaching Gowainghat, tourists reserve local engine boat namely "traller" to reach forest. There are two haors, Shimul Bil haor and Neoa Bil Haor, in the south part of the forest.

Climate 
Tropical air from the northwest of Sylhet causes heavy rainfall. According to Sylhet Weather Centre, average annual rainfall is 4162 millimeters. July hosts the most rainfall, with measures averaging 1250 millimeters. December is the driest season with 74% relative density, compared to more than 90% in July and August. The forest is linked with the Gowain River through the lake Chengir Khal. During the rainy season, water from India overflows into the lake from the Gowain River and the forest becomes flooded. This continues through the wet season from May to early October. During this time of the year, the average high temperature hits 32° Celsius (~90° Fahrenheit), and in January, the coolest month, the average high sits around 12°C (~54°F). During the rainy season, the trees of the swamp submerge about 10 ft (somewhere even 15–20 ft) under water but the forest emerges during the dry season.

Plant diversity 

73 species of plants could be found in the forest till now. 80 percent of the forest area is covered with umbrella of the trees.

Two layer of plants can be seen in the swamp forest. The upper layer consists of trees and the lower one consists of intense Schumannianthus dichotomus. The canopy of the plants spreads up to 15 meters of height.

Though the forest is natural, the Forestry Department of Bangladesh has planted some watery plants like Calamus tenuis, Neolamarckia cadamba, Barringtonia acutangula, Calamus tenuis. Banyan Tree is very common in the forest. Besides that, Barringtonia acutangula, Dalbergia reniformis, Crateva religiosa or Hygrophila (plant), Alstonia scholaris can also be seen.

Animal diversity 

Snake and worm snake can widely be seen in this water-drowned forest. Mongoose can be seen in dry season. Monkey and Water Monitor also resides in the forest. Heron, Egret, Kingfisher, Parrot, Bulbul, Swan, Dove, Water fowl, Eagle and Kite Bird are some of the birds of the swamp forest. Cotton Pygmy Goose and other Migratory birds and Vulture visit the forest in winter. Name of some local fishes available in the forest are Batasio, Rita, Pabda, Rohu etc.

Tourists attraction 

Tourists mostly go to see the forest in monsoon. One needs to take permission from the forest office to visit the forest. A local boat needs to be hired to travel through the swamp forest. There is a building tower inside the forest. If you go up there, you can see the whole view of the forest.

See also

Lalakhal

References

External links

Forests of Bangladesh
Wetlands of Bangladesh
Swamps of Asia
Tropical and subtropical moist broadleaf forests
Lower Gangetic Plains moist deciduous forests